The term anti-orthodox may refer to criticism or animosity towards any orthodox notion (religious, political, ideological, cultural, artistic).

Heterodoxy specifically refers to any opinions or doctrines which are at variance with an official or orthodox position, in religious or non-religious usage.

The capitalized term anti-Orthodox may specifically refer to :
 The Anti-Eastern Orthodox sentiment, negative sentiments and animosities towards Eastern Orthodox Christianity
 The Anti-Oriental Orthodox sentiment, negative sentiments and animosities towards Oriental Orthodox Christianity
 The Criticism of Orthodox Judaism

See also
 Orthodox (disambiguation)
 Unorthodox (disambiguation)
 Criticism of Christianity
 Persecution of Christians